Dr. F.G. Walton Smith (1909–1989) was an oceanographer who founded the first marine laboratory at the University of Miami, which ultimately grew into the university's Rosenstiel School of Marine and Atmospheric Science.

Early life 
Originally from Bristol, England, Smith received his doctorate from the University of London in biology before going on to study in the Bahamas. In 1940, he accepted a faculty position at the University of Miami. Three years later, in 1943, he started the university's marine laboratory with only a secretary and two assistants in a small boathouse.

Career 
In 1953, Smith established the International Oceanographic Foundation to encourage scientific study and exploration of the oceans, which led to the opening of a marine exhibition called Planet Ocean at Biscayne Bay. The laboratory Smith founded is now better known as the Rosenstiel School of Marine and Atmospheric Science, and he became dean of the school in 1969.  Smith was also chairman of the Gulf and Caribbean Fisheries Institute for ten years from 1948.

With Henry Chapin, Smith wrote two books, The Ocean River (1952), and The Sun, the Sea and Tomorrow (1954).

The primary research vessel of the University of Miami's Rosenstiel School is the F.G. Walton Smith, named in Smith's honor.

Personal life 
Smith lived with his wife May in Key Biscayne and had one daughter, Alexandra Hofgren and a grandson, Nicholas Hofgren. He was 80 years old when he died of heart failure in Miami in 1989.

References 

British emigrants to the United States
American oceanographers
English oceanographers
University of Miami faculty
Alumni of the University of London
Scientists from Bristol
1909 births
1989 deaths